Sílvio José Canuto (born 17 January 1977), commonly known as Silvinho, is a Brazilian football manager and former player who played as an attacking midfielder. He is the auxiliar coach of Maringá FC.

Club statistics

Honours

Player
Atlético Paranaense
Campeonato Paranaense: 2000

References

External links

1977 births
Living people
Brazilian footballers
Brazilian expatriate footballers
Expatriate footballers in Japan
Association football midfielders
Brazilian football managers
Campeonato Brasileiro Série A players
Campeonato Brasileiro Série B players
J1 League players
J2 League players
Campeonato Brasileiro Série B managers
Campeonato Brasileiro Série C managers
Londrina Esporte Clube players
Esporte Clube XV de Novembro (Piracicaba) players
Guarani FC players
Club Athletico Paranaense players
Sociedade Esportiva Matonense players
Sport Club Internacional players
Vegalta Sendai players
Albirex Niigata players
Esporte Clube Vitória players
Yokohama FC players
São José Esporte Clube players
Associação Chapecoense de Futebol players
Londrina Esporte Clube managers